Vrtanes is an Armenian given name (in Armenian Վրթանես). It may refer to:

St. Vrtanes I,  Catholicos in the Armenia's Holy Apostolic Church
Vrtanes, Locum Tenens for 4 years of Armenian Patriarchate of Jerusalem after death of Patriarch Hovhannes of Smyrna in 1860 and the election of his successor Esayee of Talas in 1864
Vrtanes Papazian (1866–1920), Armenian writer, public-political and cultural activist, literary critic, editor, literature historian, teacher and translator.